James Charlton may refer to:

 James Charlton (activist), American author  and disability rights activist
 James Charlton (poet) (born 1947), Australian poet
 James Martin Charlton (born 1966), English playwright and theatre director
 Jim Charlton (1911–2013), Canadian coin dealer and numismatic publisher